Lillian Rogers Parks (February 1, 1897 – November 6, 1997) was an American housemaid and seamstress in the White House.

With the journalist Frances Spatz Leighton, co-author of a number of White House memoirs, Parks published My Thirty Years Backstairs at the White House. The book covers a 50-year period in the life of domestic staff in the White House. It reports Parks' experiences as a seamstress, and those of her mother, 'Maggie' Rogers, who served as a housemaid for thirty years. Lillian Rogers Parks was portrayed by Leslie Uggams in the 1979 miniseries Backstairs at the White House. Many of the gifts she received (revealed in the aforementioned book) from presidents during her time there later became notable artifacts and collectibles associated with presidential history, eventually ending up in the Raleigh DeGeer Amyx Collection.  She also published The Roosevelts: A Family in Turmoil in 1981 in collaboration with Frances Spatz Leighton.  She was an honorary member of Alpha Kappa Alpha sorority.

Publications
1961: My Thirty Years Backstairs at the White House. New York: Fleet   (with F. S. Leighton)
1969: It was Fun Working at the White House. New York: Fleet   (with F. S. Leighton)
1981: The Roosevelts: A Family in Turmoil. Englewood Cliffs: Prentice-Hall   (with F. S. Leighton)

References

External links 

1897 births
1997 deaths
American centenarians
Maids
White House staff
African-American centenarians
20th-century American women writers
20th-century American non-fiction writers
American women non-fiction writers
Women centenarians
American domestic workers
Alpha Kappa Alpha members
20th-century African-American women writers
20th-century African-American writers